In 1958 Pope Pius XII declared that the Feast of the Holy Winding Sheet of Christ (now usually known as the Turin Shroud) was to be kept on the day before Ash Wednesday.

History

A Feast of the Holy Winding Sheet of Christ originated about 1495 at Chambéry, in Savoy, to honour the so-called sudario of Christ. It came there in 1432 from Lirey in Burgundy, and is the sheet venerated from 1578 in the royal chapel of the cathedral of Turin. 

This feast was celebrated on 4 May, the day after the Invention of the Cross, and was approved in 1506 by Pope Julius II; it was kept in Savoy, Piedmont, and Sardinia as the patronal feast of the royal House of Savoy (4 May, double of the first class, with octave).

Besançon feast

In 1206 another one of the supposed Winding Sheets used at the burial of Christ was brought to Besançon by Otto de la Roche, and the feast of its arrival (Susceptio) was ordered to be kept on 11 July. It became a double of the first class in the cathedral, and of the second class in the diocese.

Compiègne feast

A third feast, the Fourth Sunday in Lent (translation to a new shrine in 1092), was during the Middle Ages kept at Compiègne in France, in honour of a winding sheet brought there from Aachen in 877.

1831 feast

The feast which from 1831 was contained in the appendix of the Breviary, on the Friday after the Second Sunday in Lent, was independent of any particular relic. Before 1831 it was rarely found on diocesan calendars. The office was taken from the Proprium of Turin.

References

Attribution
 The entry cites:
Nilles, Kalendarium Manuale (Innsbruck, 1897); 
Robault de Fleury, Instrumens de la Passion (Paris, 1870);
Chevalier, Le Saint-Suaire de Turin in Analecta Bollandiana (1900)

Catholic holy days
Holidays based on the date of Easter